Strike the Blood is an anime series adapted from the light novel series of the same title written by Gakuto Mikumo with illustrations by Manyako. Produced by Silver Link and Connect, the series is directed by Hideyo Yamamoto with scripts by Hiroyuki Yoshino and character design by Keiichi Sano. The second opening theme is "Fight 4 Real" by Altima and the second ending theme is "Signal" by Kanon Wakeshima. Crunchyroll (with distribution by Discotek Media) released the anime series in a combined Blu-ray/DVD format on November 8, 2016.

On March 15, 2015, publisher Dengeki Bunko announced that a two-part OVA based on an original story by creator Gakuto Mikumo would be released by year's end. On August 14, 2015, further details were announced for Strike the Blood: Valkyria's Kingdom which would be released on DVD/BRD on November 25 and December 23 of that year.


Episode list

References

Strike the Blood episode lists
2013 Japanese television seasons
2014 Japanese television seasons